A list of films produced in France in 1965.

See also 
 1965 in France

References

Footnotes

Sources

External links
 French films of 1965 at the Internet Movie Database
French films of 1965 at Cinema-francais.fr

1965
Films
French